Qutan may refer to:
 Qutan, Iran, a village in West Azerbaijan Province, Iran
 Qutan, the Chinese variant of the given name Gautama
 Gautama Siddha, also known as Qutan Xida ( 8th century), Chinese astronomer and astrologer

See also 
 Cutan (disambiguation)
 Kutan (disambiguation)
 Qotan, a village in East Azerbaijan Province, Iran
 Podvodnyye Islands, also known as Qutan Adası, a group of islands in Azerbaijan

 Qutang Gorge in China